Erysimum etnense is a short-lived, polycarpic perennial herb endemic and found exclusively on Mount Etna, in Sicily, Italy. It grows from 1000 to 2000 metres above sea level and inhabits Genista aetnensis shrublands.

References

etnense
Endemic flora of Sicily